PTR can refer to:

 Particle transfer roller, for cleaning motion picture film
 Peak-to-trough ratio, a parameter in pharmacokinetics
 Petir LRT station (LRT station abbreviation), Singapore
 PetroChina (NYSE: PTR)
 Photothermal Ratio, light/temperature ratio for a plant
 Physical transmission right in the electricity market
 Physikalisch-Technische Reichsanstalt, later Physikalisch-Technische Bundesanstalt, a German research institute
 Pitrilysin, an enzyme
 Planar ternary ring in algebra
 Pool Test Reactor, Canada
 Proton-transfer-reaction mass spectrometry, used in chemical analysis
 PTR rifle, made by PTR Industries, Inc., US
 A type of DNS record in computer networking
 Pointer in computer programming (e.g. the PTR keyword in x86 assembly language)
 Palanivel Thiagarajan, an Indian politician